T'uruqucha (Quechua t'uru mud, qucha lake, "mud lake", also spelled Torococha) is a mountain in the Andes of Peru which reaches a height of approximately . It is located in the Junín Region, Jauja Province, Apata District. T'uruqucha lies south of Utkhulasu.

References 

Mountains of Peru
Mountains of Junín Region